The Welsh House, also known as Welsh Residence in Syracuse, New York was built in 1912.  It was listed, along with other Ward Wellington Ward-designed homes, on the National Register of Historic Places in 1997.

References

Houses in Syracuse, New York
National Register of Historic Places in Syracuse, New York
Houses on the National Register of Historic Places in New York (state)
Houses completed in 1912